Gardabhilla, who was believed to be the father of a legendary ruler, Vikramaditya, was a king of Ujjain in the first century BC.

Life
He is said to have kidnapped the sister of Kalakacharya II (a Jain monk). According to Merutunga's Vicarasreni, he rose to power in 74 BCE and was defeated by Sakas in 61 BCE. But Merutuṅga's works are generally regarded to be of poor quality, as compared with his contemporaries and with modern historians.

References

Citations

Sources
 
 

1st-century Indian monarchs